Ourapteryx flavovirens is a moth of the family Geometridae first described by Inoue in 1985. It is found in Taiwan.

References

Moths described in 1985
Ourapterygini